Dejan Borovnjak (born April 1, 1986) is a Serbian professional basketball player for Antalya Güneşi of the Turkish Basketball First League.

Professional career
Borovnjak began his professional career in 2004 with Partizan Belgrade. In the summer of 2008, he moved to Vojvodina Srbijagas. In May 2009, he parted ways with Vojvodina.

On May 28, 2009, he signed with Lietuvos rytas of Lithuania. In January 2010, he was loaned to the Greek team Panionios for the rest of the season. On July 20, 2010, he signed a one-year deal with another Greek team Aris. In March 2011, he moved to Spain and signed with CB Gran Canaria for the remainder of the season.

On July 28, 2011, he signed a one-year deal with New Basket Brindisi of the Italian Legadue Basket. He was one of the key players for Brindisi to reach the promotion in Serie A. In July 2012, he extended his contract with Brindisi for one more season. In August 2012, club decided to release him, because he underwent surgery and won't be able to play for several weeks.

On November 21, 2012, he signed a one-month deal with K.A.O.D. of Greece. On December 26, 2012, he signed with Stelmet Zielona Góra of Poland for the rest of the season. With them he won the Polish Basketball League in the 2012–13 season. That was the first championship in the history of Zielona Góra.

On June 13, 2013, he signed a one-year deal with Royal Halı Gaziantep of the Turkish Basketball League.

On July 16, 2014, he signed with Triumph Lyubertsy of Russia. After the deal the team moved to Saint Petersburg, so Borovnjak became a Zenit player. On July 22, 2015, he parted ways with Zenit.

On August 13, 2015, he returned to Stelmet Zielona Góra for the 2015–16 season.

On July 2, 2016, he signed a one-year contract with Turkish club Bursaspor. On June 16, 2017, he signed a two-year contract extension with Bursaspor.

On September 5, 2019, he has signed with CSO Voluntari of the Liga Națională.

References

External links
 Euroleague.net profile
 Eurobasket.com profile
 FIBA.com profile
 TBLstat.net profile

1986 births
Living people
Serbs of Croatia
ABA League players
Aris B.C. players
Basketball League of Serbia players
Basket Zielona Góra players
BC Rytas players
Bursaspor Basketbol players
CB Gran Canaria players
CSO Voluntari players
Gaziantep Basketbol players
K.A.O.D. B.C. players
KK Partizan players
KK Vojvodina Srbijagas players
KK Zlatibor players
Liga ACB players
Medalists at the 2009 Summer Universiade
New Basket Brindisi players
Panionios B.C. players
Power forwards (basketball)
Serbian expatriate basketball people in Greece
Serbian expatriate basketball people in Italy
Serbian expatriate basketball people in Lithuania
Serbian expatriate basketball people in Poland
Serbian expatriate basketball people in Russia
Serbian expatriate basketball people in Spain
Serbian expatriate basketball people in Turkey
Serbian men's basketball players
Sportspeople from Knin
Croatian expatriate basketball people in Serbia
Universiade gold medalists for Serbia
Universiade medalists in basketball
Universiade silver medalists for Serbia